Thimoteus Tjamuaha was the Chairman of the Executive Committee of Hereroland from 1980–1984, a bantustan under the control of Apartheid South Africa. In this position he was the highest representative of his homeland to the South African administration in South-West Africa.

References

Year of birth missing (living people)
Living people
Namibian politicians
Herero people